Una donna da guardare (also known in English-speaking countries as What a Girl and Pamela) is a 1990 Italian erotic movie directed by Michele Quaglieri and starring Pamela Prati.

Plot
Gianni is a middle-aged man with sexual problems. His doctor, seeing that medicines are useless, advised him to try to have relationships with several women. Only a beautiful psychologist will be able to solve her problem.

Cast
 Pamela Prati as Pamela	
 Mauro Vestri as Gianni Luraghi	
 George Ardisson as prof. Mueller	
 Elisabetta Focardi as Assistant of prof. Mueller
 Cinzia De Carolis as Marisa	
 Sonia Topazio as Adriana

See also    
 List of Italian films of 1990

References

External links

1990 films
Italian erotic films
1990s Italian-language films
1990s Italian films